Volksgesang is a sculpture by Louis Sussmann-Hellborn, installed in the Tiergarten in Berlin, Germany.

References

 https://www.herder.de/gd/lexikon/volksgesang/

Mitte
Outdoor sculptures in Berlin
Statues in Germany
Sculptures of women in Germany
Tiergarten (park)